The Thousand-Dollar Husband is a lost 1916 American silent drama film written and directed by James Young and starring Blanche Sweet, Theodore Roberts, Tom Forman, James Neill, Horace B. Carpenter, and Lucille La Verne. The film was released on May 28, 1916, by Paramount Pictures.

Plot

Cast 
Blanche Sweet as Olga Nelson
Theodore Roberts as Uncle Sven Johnson
Tom Forman as Douglas Gordon
James Neill as Stephen Gordon
Horace B. Carpenter as Lawyer Judson
Lucille La Verne as Mme. Batavia
E.L. Delaney as Jack Hardy
Camille Astor as Maggie, Olga's Friend
Jane Wolfe

References

External links 

1916 films
1910s English-language films
Silent American drama films
1916 drama films
Paramount Pictures films
Films directed by James Young
American black-and-white films
American silent feature films
1910s American films